Brandon Morales (born September 28, 1999) is an American soccer player who currently plays for Rio Grande Valley FC Toros in the United Soccer League.

Career
On July 13, 2018, Morales joined United Soccer League side RGVFC Toros, becoming their first academy graduate to join the first team. He made his professional debut on September 22, 2018, starting in a 3–0 win over Seattle Sounders FC 2.

References

External links

Cornell bio

1999 births
American soccer players
Association football midfielders
Living people
Rio Grande Valley FC Toros players
USL Championship players
Soccer players from Texas
People from Pharr, Texas
Cornell Big Red men's soccer players